Zaw Min Latt (born 12 April 1974), also known as Ko Latt, is a Burmese politician currently serving as a House of Nationalities MP representing the Shan State No. 1 constituency. He is a member of National League for Democracy.

Early life and career
He was born on 12 April 1974 in Shwebo, Sagaing Region, Burma (Myanmar). He graduated with B.E (Mechanical), MIT from
Mandalay Technological University. His previous job was as a trader.

Political career
He is a member of the National League for Democracy. In the 2015 Myanmar general election, he was elected to the Amyotha Hluttaw, winning a majority of 226919 votes from the Shan State No. 1 parliamentary constituency.

References

Members of the House of Nationalities
 National League for Democracy  politicians
1974 births
Living people
People from Sagaing Region
People from Shan State